Carlos Fonseca Suárez (born 1987, in San José, Costa Rica) is a Costa Rican-Puerto Rican writer and academic. He is the author of the novels Colonel Lágrimas, Museo animal, and Austral.  In 2016, he was selected by the Guadalajara International Book Fair as one of the top twenty Latin American authors born in the eighties. In 2017, he was selected by the Hay Festival as one of the top thirty-nine Latin American authors under forty. In 2021, he was selected by Granta Magazine as one of their Best Young Spanish-Language Novelists. He was also chosen by Encyclopedia Britannica as part of their Young Shapers of the Future 20 Under 40 Initiative, as one of the top twenty young international authors.

Biography 
Fonseca Suárez was born in San José, Costa Rica in 1987. Born to a Costa Rican father and a Puerto Rican mother, he spent most of his adolescence in Puerto Rico.

After attending high school at Colegio San Ignacio in Puerto Rico, he attended Stanford University where in 2009 he graduated with a degree in Comparative Literature. He then attended Princeton University where he obtained a PhD.

He is currently Assistant Professor in Postcolonial Latin American Literature and Culture at the University of Cambridge, as well as Fellow of Trinity College.  He lives in Cambridge, United Kingdom with his family.

Works 

Colonel Lágrimas

His first novel, Colonel Lágrimas, published in Spain and Latin America by Anagrama and in English by Restless Books, received critical acclaim and was praised by The Guardian as a “dazzling debut” and by Valerie Miles, in The New York Times Book Review as a “gorgeous opera prima” Loosely based on the life story of the eccentric mathematician Alexander Grothendieck, it tells the story of a man attempting to compose a total encyclopaedia.

Natural History

His second novel was published in Spain and Latin America by Anagrama as Museo animal, and in English (translated by Megan McDowell) by Farrar, Straus and Giroux. The New York Times, writing about the novel, said that “its plotting and Delphic aura suggest the paranoiac glitter of Don DeLillo, the cosmopolitan dread of Roberto Bolaño and the imaginative elasticity of Ricardo Piglia.”  Kirkus Reviews, in a Starred review, described it as "an elegant meditation on art, inconstancy, and hiding, with a deftly woven subtext of camouflage that emerges as the narrative progresses."

Austral

His third novel was published in Spain and Latin America by Anagrama as Austral, and is forthcoming in English (translated by Megan McDowell) by Farrar, Straus and Giroux (US) and MacLehose Press (UK).  It was described by the Spanish Newspaper El Mundo as “a brilliant inquiry in the archive of memory.” 

La Lucidez del Miope

He is also the author of a book of essays, where he writes about the works of writers that have inspired him like Ricardo Piglia, W.G. Sebald, Roberto Bolaño, Marta Aponte and Enrique Vila-Matas. This book won the Premio Nacional Aquileo J. Echevarría, Costa Rica’s National Prize of Literature, in the Essay Category.

Awards 

• Premio Nacional Aquileo J. Echevarría for La Lucidez del Miope

• Granta Magazine’s Best Spanish-Language Novelists, 2021

• Hay Festival’s Bogotá 39 Selection, 2017

• Encyclopaedia Britannica’s Young Shapers of the Future, 2020

Bibliography 

•	Coronel Lágrimas (Anagrama, 2015). Translated by Megan McDowell as Colonel Lágrimas (Restless Books, 2016)

•	Museo animal (Anagrama, 2017). Translated by Megan McDowell as Natural History (Farrar, Straus and Giroux, 2020)

•	La Lucidez del Miope (Editorial Germinal, 2017)

•	Austral (Anagrama, 2022). Translated by Megan McDowell as Austral (Farrar, Straus and Giroux, 2023 and MacLehose Press, 2023)

References 

Living people
1987 births
Colegio San Ignacio de Loyola alumni
Puerto Rican writers
Costa Rican writers
Princeton University alumni
Stanford University alumni
Fellows of Trinity College, Cambridge